Walzer may refer to:

Waltzes
Cagliostro-Walzer (Cagliostro Waltz)
Döblinger Réunion-Walzer (Döbling Reunion Waltz)
Ewiger Walzer (The Eternal Waltz)
Gesellschafts-Walzer (Association's Waltz)
Kaiser-Walzer (Emperor Waltz)
Kettenbrücke-Walzer (Chain Bridge Waltz)
Kuss-Walzer (Kiss Waltz)
Lagunen-Walzer (Lagoon Waltz)
Schatz-Walzer (Treasure Waltz)
Täuberln-Walzer (Little Doves Waltz)
Wiener Launen-Walzer (Vienna Fancies Waltz)

Operas and operettas
Der letzte Walzer (The Last Waltz)
Hoheit tanzt Walzer (Her Highness Dances the Waltz)
Walzer aus Wien (Waltzes in Vienna or The Great Waltz)

Films
Der himmlische Walzer (The Heavenly Waltz)
Ein Walzer von Strauß (A Waltz by Strauss)
Es war einmal ein Walzer (Once There Was a Waltz)
Unsterblicher Walzer (Immortal Waltz)
Waldheims Walzer (The Waldheim Waltz)

Other uses
Walzer (surname)
Wälzer (surname)
La Ola Walzer (The Wave Waltzer)
Liebeslieder Walzer (disambiguation) (Love Songs Waltz)
Vienna Walzer Orchestra

See also
Waltzer (surname)